The Kivu Railway (French: Chemins de fer du Kivu) was a  long narrow gauge railway with a gauge of  from Kalundu to Kamaniola in the Congo, which operated from 1931 to 1958.

History

The privately owned Comité national du Kivu (C.N.Ki) decided in 1928  to build a connection between Uviara at the northern end of Lake Tanganyika to Bukavu (Costermansville) at the southern end of Lake Kivu.

The Compagnie des Chemins de fer du Kivu (C.E.F.A.K.I.) was established on 20 June 1929. It obtained the concession according to a decree of the  Belgian Chamber of Representatives on 1 March 1930, which became ratified on 23 April 1930. C.E.F.A.K.I. was integrated into the Office des Transports Coloniaux (OTRACO) on 24 July 1946. The track was built by the Compagnie Belge des Chemin de fer et d'Entreprise (C.F.E.) and its first section from Kalundu to Kamanyola was inaugurated on 21 November 1931.

There were plans to integrate the track into the Cape to Cairo Railway. However, the plans to extend the railway from Kamaniola to Costermansville did not get realized due to the comparatively high cost.

Passenger traffic ceased on 1 July 1958 and goods traffic on 1 December 1958.

Rolling stock
The rolling stock consisted of :
 2 steam locomotives Mikado (2-8-2) with 32 t each
 2 diesel locomotives with 27 t and 190 PS each, which were commissioned in 1949
 2 Davenport diesel locomotives, which were commissioned in 1950
 2 shunting steam engines with 22 t each
 88 waggons

Traffic 
The traffic in the early 1950s was as follows:

References

External links
 

Metre gauge railways in the Democratic Republic of the Congo
Railway lines opened in 1931
Railway lines closed in 1958
Railway lines in the Democratic Republic of the Congo
1931 establishments in the Belgian Congo